This is a list of notable XML markup languages.

A
AdsML Markup language used for interchange of data between advertising systems.
aecXML: a mark-up language which uses Industry Foundation Classes to create a vendor-neutral means to access data generated by Building Information Modeling.
AFrame: a mark-up language to create 3D graphics on web pages **.
Agricultural Ontology Service
AIML Markup language used for creating artificial intelligence chatterbots.
AnIML Markup language used for data created by scientific analytical instruments.
ARXML Autosar specification description XML 
Atom (standard): The Atom Syndication Format is a language used for web feeds
Attention Profiling Mark-up Language (APML): format for capturing a person's interests and dislikes
Automated Test Markup Language (ATML): defines a standard exchange medium for sharing information between components of automatic test systems.
Attention.xml: used for RSS and similar online subscription-tracking applications
Auto-lead Data Format: an open XML-based standard specifically for communicating consumer purchase requests to automotive dealerships.

B

BeerXML: a free XML based data description standard for the exchange of brewing data
Binary Format Description language: an extension of XSIL which has added conditionals and the ability to reference files by their stream numbers, rather than by their public URLs
Biological Dynamics Markup Language (BDML) is an XML format for quantitative data describing biological dynamics.
Business Intelligence Markup Language (BIML) is an XML dialect for defining business intelligence (BI) assets.
Business Process Execution Language: a business process modeling language that is executable

C
Call Control eXtensible Markup Language: a standard designed to provide telephony support to VoiceXML
CCTRL: a call control XML that allows developers to create telephony services that run on Lignup, Inc.'s software communications platform
CellML: a language describing mathematical models
Channel Definition Format
Chemical Markup Language
ClaML : Classification Markup Language for health informatics, accepted as European Norm EN 14463:2007.
Clinical Data Interchange Standards Consortium
Clinical Document Architecture
COLLADA: a standard for exchanging digital assets among various graphics software applications
Common Alerting Protocol (CAP)
CXML: a protocol intended for communication of business documents between procurement applications, e-commerce hubs and suppliers
CityGML: An open standardised data model and exchange format to store digital 3D models of cities and landscapes.

D
Darwin Information Typing Architecture (DITA): A document format used by publishers
Data center markup language
Data Format Description Language
Digital Forensics XML
Dimensional Markup Language
Directory Service Markup Language
DisplayML
DocBook: a markup language for technical documentation.
Document Schema Definition Languages
Document Structure Description: a schema language for XML

E
EAC: Encoded Archival Context
EAD: Encoded Archival Description
ebXML: a collection of electronic business specifications
eLML: eLesson Markup Language
EMML Enterprise Mashup Markup Language
EPPML: Extensible Postal Product Model and Language
EPUB: electronic publication, open e-book format
Extensible Application Markup Language
Extensible Data Format
Extensible Messaging and Presence Protocol
Extensible Provisioning Protocol
Extensible Resource Identifier
Extensible Stylesheet Language

F
Facelets VDL: View declaration language used in the Facelets framework and JavaServer Faces.
FicML: Fiction Markup Language
FictionBook: an e-book format
FIXatdl, FIX algorithmic trading definition language. Schema provides a HCI between a human trader, the order entry screen(s), unlimited different algorithmic trading types (called strategies) from a variety of sources, and formats a new order message on the FIX wire.
FIXML, Financial Information eXchange (FIX) protocol in XML format. FIX is a very widely deployed messaging protocol used between financial traders worldwide.
FleXML: an XML transformation language
FpML, Financial products Markup Language. Used to describe complex financial products.
FXT: transformation specification for the Functional XML Transformation Tool

G
Geography Markup Language: a grammar defined by the Open Geospatial Consortium (OGC) to express geographical features
GeoSciML: a GML Application Schema that can be used to transfer information about geology, with an emphasis on the "interpreted geology" that is conventionally portrayed on geologic maps.
GJXDM: a data reference model for the exchange of information within the justice and public safety communities
GPX: a language designed for transferring GPS data between software applications
GraphML: a standard exchange format for graphs
Green Building XML: also known as "gbXML", a schema to facilitate the transfer of building properties stored in 3D building information models (BIM) to engineering analysis tools, especially energy and building performance analysis
General Station Description Markup Language (GSDML): used to describe the communication interface of a Profinet device
GuideML
GXA: an extension of SOAP being worked on by Microsoft, IBM and some other developers
GXL: a standard exchange format for graphs

H
HumanML: for describing contextual (emotional, social, pragmatic) information about instances of human communication

I
Industry Foundation Classes: specifically the "ifcXML" format, defined by ISO 10303-28 ("STEP-XML"), having file extension ".ifcXML". This format is suitable for interoperability with XML tools and exchanging partial building models.
Information and Content Exchange
IO Device Description (IODD): contains information about the device's identity, parameters, process data, diagnosis data and IO-Link communication properties.

J
JATS: a vocabulary used for the preparation and publication of scholarly articles.
Java Speech Markup Language: a language for annotating text input to speech synthesizers.
Job Definition Format: a standard developed by the graphic arts industry to facilitate cross-vendor workflow implementations
Job Submission Description Language: describes simple tasks to non-interactive computer execution systems

K
Keyhole Markup Language: geographic annotation

L
Link contract
LOGML: Log Markup Language, for describing the log reports of web servers

M
MARCXML: a schema developed by the Library of Congress to enable the sharing and accessing of bibliographic information
MathML: a language describing mathematical notation
Medical Reality Markup Language (MRML)
Metadata Object Description Schema: an XML schema with bibliographic elements used for a variety of library applications
Microformats: a piece mark up that allows expression of semantics in an HTML (or XHTML) web page
MOWL: semantic interactions with multimedia content
Music Encoding Initiative (MEI):  an XML-based language for digital representations of music notation documents.
Music Markup Language
MusicXML: an XML-based music notation file format.
MXML: a language used to declaratively lay-out the interface of applications, and also to implement complex business logic and rich internet application behaviors

N
Namespace-based Validation Dispatching Language
National Information Exchange Model
Nested Context Language
NewsML: provides a media-independent, structural framework for multi-media news (Superseded by NewsML-G2)
NewsML-G2: an XML multimedia news exchange format standard of the IPTC, the International Press Telecommunications Council
NeXML: an XML representation of the NeXus data format
NeuroML: computational neuroscience models

O
ODD: A 'One Document Does-it-all' TEI format for simultaneously recording project documentation and meta-schema definition from which you can generate RELAX NG, W3C XML Schema, and DTDs as well as formatted documentation.
ODRL: an XML-based standard Rights Expression Language (REL) used in Digital Rights Management systems
Office Open XML: is a Microsoft file format specification for the storage of electronic documents
OFX: Open Financial Exchange is a unified specification for the electronic exchange of financial data between financial institutions, businesses and consumers via the Internet.
OIOXML: an XML-markup language created by the Danish government to ease communication from, to and between Danish governmental instances
Open Mathematical Documents (OMDoc), based on OpenMath and MathML, but with a greater coverage.
OML: an XML format for outlines, based on OPML.
Open eBook: the e-book format defined by Open eBook Publication Structure Specification; superseded by ePub.
Open Scripture Information Standard (OSIS), an XML-markup schema that defines tags for marking up Bibles, theological commentaries, and other related literature.
OpenDocument (ODF): a document file format used for describing electronic documents
OpenMath – a markup language for mathematical formulae which can complement MathML.
OPML: an XML format for outlines

P
phyloXML – XML for phylogenetic and phylogenomic applications
PMML – XML for predictive analytics and data mining
PNML – Petri Net Markup Language
PreTeXt – An authoring and publishing system for authors of textbooks, research articles, and monographs, especially in mathematics and other STEM disciplines.
PDBML – XML for Protein Data Bank

R
RailML: language for interoperability in railway industry applications.
RDFa
RecipeML
Regular Language description for XML
RELAX NG: a schema language
Remote Telescope Markup Language
Resource Description Framework: a metadata model based upon the idea of making statements about web resources
RoadXML: file format for driving simulator database.
RSS (file format)
RSS enclosure
RuleML: a markup language for rules

S
S1000D: “International specification for technical publications using a common source database”, is an international specification for the production of technical publications.
S5 file format: slideshow data
SAML: authentication and authorization data
SBML: models of biological processes
SBGN: graphical representation of cellular processes and biological networks
Schematron: an XML structure validation language for making assertions about the presence or absence of patterns in trees
SCORM: XML for web-based e-learning
SCXML: provides a generic state-machine based execution environment based on Harel statecharts
Simple Sharing Extensions
SMIL: Synchronized Multimedia Integration Language describes multimedia presentations
SOAP: a protocol for exchanging XML-based messages over computer networks
SOAP with Attachments: the method of using Web Services to send and receive files using a combination of SOAP and MIME, primarily over HTTP.
Speech Application Language Tags
Speech Synthesis Markup Language: a language for speech synthesis applications
SPML: user, resource and service provisioning information
Strategy Markup Language (StratML): an XML vocabulary and schema for strategic and performance plans and reports
Streaming Transformations for XML: a XML transformation language intended as a high-speed, low memory consumption alternative to XSLT.
 SVG: Scalable Vector Graphics
SXBL: defines the presentation and interactive behavior of elements described in SVG

T
Text Encoding Initiative – guidelines for text encoding, with schemas and a mechanism to customise to individual project needs.
ThML – Theological Markup Language created by Christian Classics Ethereal Library (CCEL), to create electronic theological texts.
Topicmaps
TransducerML – Open Geospatial Consortium language for describing sensors and their output
Translation Memory eXchange (TMX): translation memory data
TREX: a simple schema language

U
Unified XUL Platform: a 2017 fork of XUL.
Universal Business Language: an open library of standard electronic XML business documents developed by OASIS (organization)
Universal Description Discovery and Integration: a registry for businesses worldwide to list themselves on the Internet

V
Vector Markup Language: used to produce vector graphics, implemented in Microsoft Office 2000 and higher
VoiceXML: format for specifying interactive voice dialogues between a human and a computer

W
W3C MMI
WDDX: Web Distributed Data eXchange
WaterML: standard information model for the representation of water observations data, with the intent of allowing the exchange of such data sets across information systems.
Web feed
Web Ontology Language: a language for defining and instantiating Web ontologies (a set of concepts within a domain and the relationships between those concepts)
Web Services Description Language: an XML-based language that provides a model for describing Web services
Web Services Dynamic Discovery: a technical specification that defines a multicast discovery protocol to locate services on a local network.
Wellsite information transfer standard markup language
WML Wireless Markup Language
WiX: Windows installers data
WordprocessingML: a file format specification for the storage of electronic documents
WS-Policy

X
X3D: Extensible 3D (X3D) is an international standard for real-time 3D computer graphics, the successor to Virtual Reality Modeling Language (VRML)
XAML: is a declarative XML-based language that Microsoft developed for initializing structured values and objects.
XACML: eXtensible Access Control Markup Language
XBEL : the XML Bookmark Exchange Language.
XBL: used to declare the behavior and look of 'XUL'-widgets and XML elements
XBRL: an open data standard for financial reporting.
xCBL: a collection of XML specifications for use in e-business.
xCal: the XML-compliant representation of the iCalendar standard
XCES: an XML based standard to codify text corpus
XDI: sharing, linking, and synchronizing data using machine-readable structured documents that use an RDF vocabulary based on XRI structured identifiers
XDuce: an XML transformation language
XDXF: for monolingual and bilingual dictionaries
XFA: enhance the processing of web forms
XForms: a format for the specification of a data processing model for XML data and user interface(s) for the XML data, such as web forms
XHTML: a markup language that has the same depth of expression as HTML, but with a syntax conforming to XML
XHTML Basic
XHTML Friends Network
XHTML Modularization
XidML: an open standard used within the flight test instrumentation industry that describes instrumentation and how data is acquired, stored, transmitted and processed
XInclude: a processing model and syntax for general purpose XML inclusion
XLIFF: XML Localization Interchange File Format, a format created to standardize localization.
XLink: a language used for creating hyperlinks in XML documents
XMI: an OMG standard for exchanging metadata information via XML. The most common use of XMI is as an interchange format for UML models
XML Encryption: a specification that defines how to encrypt the content of an XML element
XML Information Set: describing an abstract data model of an XML document in terms of a set of information items
XML Interface for Network Services: definition and implementation of internet applications, enforcing a specification-oriented approach.
XML Resource: provide a platform independent way of describing windows in a GUI
XML Schema: a description of a type of XML document, typically expressed in terms of constraints on the structure and content of documents of that type, above and beyond the basic syntax constraints imposed by XML itself
XML Script: an XML transformation language, or a Microsoft technology preview for scripting web browsers
XML Signature: an XML syntax for digital signatures
XML for Analysis: data access in analytical systems, such as OLAP and Data Mining
XML pipeline: a language expressing how XML transformations are connected together
XML-RPC: a remote procedure call protocol which uses XML to encode its calls and HTTP as a transport mechanism
XMLTerm: A Mozilla-based Semantic User Interface
XMLTV: a format to represent TV listings.
XOMGL: obtain large amounts of data from municipal government agencies.
XOXO: an XML microformat for publishing outlines, lists, and blogrolls on the Web
XPDL: interchange Business Process definitions between different workflow products
XPath (or XPath 1.0): an expression language for addressing portions of an XML document
XPath 2.0: a language for addressing portions of XML documents, successor of XPath 1.0
XPointer: a system for addressing components of XML based internet media
XProc : a W3C standard language to describe XML Pipeline
XQuery: a query language designed to query collections of XML data (similar to SQL)
XrML: the eXtensible Rights Markup Language, or the Rights Expression Language (REL) for MPEG-21
XSIL: an XML-based transport language for scientific data
XSL Formatting Objects: a markup language for XML document formatting which is most often used to generate PDFs
XSL Transformations: a language used for the transformation of XML documents.
XSPF: a playlist format for digital media
XTCE: describes binary blocks for telemetry and command exchange
XUL: a XML user interface markup language developed by the Mozilla project.
XUpdate: a lightweight query language for modifying XML data

References

 
XML-based standards
XML markup languages
Lists of markup languages